Avon Fields Golf Course is a historic golf course in Cincinnati, Ohio, USA.

The course was developed and run by the city until the late 1990s when Kemper Sports Management won the rights to run the city courses. In 2003, Billy Casper Golf took over the contract.

Avon Field is located in North Avondale and borders Norwood. The course is the oldest municipal course west of the Alleghenies. City records cannot be found for the original course designer. The Donald Ross archival website lists Avon Fields as one of his designs. Others suggest it was designed by a member of the Spaulding family, later famous for sporting goods.
While records show that renowned architect William Langford a revision of the design in 1925.

Avon is a par 66 18-hole golf course consisting of 12 par 4s and 6 par 3s and a full service driving range. The front and back nines were switched in the 1960s, when construction of the Norwood Lateral provided the impetus to reduce some of the steepest hills and to rework this vintage course

References

Golf clubs and courses in Ohio
Sports venues completed in 1915
1915 establishments in Ohio